San Carlos Department may refer to:
San Carlos Department, Chile (former)
San Carlos Department, Mendoza (Argentina)
San Carlos Department, Salta (Argentina)

Department name disambiguation pages